Anna Alboth is a Polish journalist, blogger and political activist. She gained international attention as the initiator of the Civil March for Aleppo—a peace march on foot from Berlin to Aleppo from December 2016 to August 2017, for which she was nominated for the Nobel Peace Prize in 2018.

In the summer of 2021, Alboth co-initiated Grupa Granica—a group of Polish human rights organizations that care for refugees on the Belarusian–Polish border.

Life and career 
Alboth went to school in Warsaw. In 2009 she finished her studies at the University of Warsaw. As student journalist she started working at the Polish daily newspaper Gazeta Wyborcza.

In 2009, she and her husband Thomas Alboth launched the travel blog The Family Without Borders, which won National Geographic Poland's "Travel Blog of the Year" in 2011. Publications in the Polish National Geographic and other travel magazines followed, as well as a travel book about Central America in 2016.

While living in Berlin in the times of the 2015 European migrant crisis, she used the popularity of the travel blog and social media to collect sleeping bags in Poland and clothing for refugees waiting on the streets in Berlin for their asylum procedure. In December 2016, she initiated the Civil March for Aleppo, for which she was nominated for the Nobel Peace Prize in 2018.

Since 2018, she has been working for the human rights organization Minority Rights Group International. In the summer of 2021, she was a co-initiator and then a member of Grupa Granica.

She lives with her family in Berlin.

Publications 

 Rodzina bez granic w Ameryce Środkowej. Warsaw: Agora, 2016. .

References 

Polish women journalists
Polish activists
Living people
Year of birth missing (living people)